The Serra da Mesa Dam, once known as Sao Felix, is an embankment dam on the Tocantins River near Minaçu in Goiás, Brazil. The dam serves an associated hydroelectric power plant with a  installed capacity. The dam creates the largest reservoir by volume in Brazil.

Background
Eletrobrás Furnas began studies of the upper Tocantins River in 1981 and proposed constructing two large dams, one was at Serra da Mesa which had good geomechanical conditions. After years of studies, construction on the dam and power station began in 1986. On October 24, 1996, the dam began to inundate and create its reservoir and it was full in 1998; around the same time, the power station's generators became operational.

Dam and reservoir
Of the reservoir's volume,  is active storage. In total, the spillway has a  discharge capacity.

Serra da Mesa Hydroelectric Power Station
The dam supports the Serra da Mesa Hydroelectric Power Station, an underground power station and hydraulic circuit. Water then reaches the Francis turbines which power three  generators.

Environmental impact
The Serra da Mesa Dam was sharply criticized by environmentalists before and during construction. Organizations, such as the International Rivers Network criticized the dam and its reservoir for destroying a vast area of flora and fauna along with destroying the habitat of endangered species. In addition, the dam was criticized for flooding archeological sites and $15 million worth of timber that was not removed prior to flooding.

See also

Tucuruí dam

References

Dams completed in 1998
Dams in Goiás
Earth-filled dams
Underground power stations